Ischnophanes is a genus of moths of the family Coleophoridae.

Species
Ischnophanes aquilina Baldizzone & van der Wolf, 2003
Ischnophanes baldizzonella Vives, 1983
Ischnophanes bifurcata Baldizzone, 1994
Ischnophanes canariella Baldizzone, 1984
Ischnophanes excentra Baldizzone & van der Wolf, 2003
Ischnophanes monocentra Meyrick, 1891

References

Coleophoridae
Taxa named by Edward Meyrick
Moth genera